Japan has more than 270 high-rise buildings above . Unlike other Asian countries with skyscrapers exceeding  in height, Japan's skyscrapers are relatively shorter. Construction is difficult due to the high cost of labour and construction material, as well as legal height restrictions (as in many other developed countries); all buildings above  must also be as earthquake-proof as possible and adhere to other strict structural standards.

When completed in 2027, the  Torch Tower will surpass the Azabudai Hills Mori JP Tower and become the new tallest building in Japan.

Completed
This height includes spires and architectural details but does not include antenna masts. An equal sign (=) following a rank indicates the same height between two or more buildings. The "Year" column indicates the year in which a building was completed. Existing partially habitable structures are included for comparison purposes; however, they are not ranked.

Under construction
This lists buildings that are under construction in Japan and are planned to rise at least . Any buildings that have been topped out but are not completed are also included.

Proposed
This lists buildings that are proposed for construction in Japan and are planned to rise at least .

Timeline of tallest buildings

This is a list of buildings that once held the title of tallest building in Japan. From its completion in 1958 and until the opening of the Tokyo Skytree in 2011, Tokyo Tower retained the title of tallest structure in Japan, aside from various guyed masts that were built in the 1960s and 1970s, later dismantled in the 1990s.

Tallest structures
This list ranks Japanese structures that stand at least 210 metres (689 ft) tall, based on standard height measurement. This height includes spires, architectural details and antenna masts.

Demolished or destroyed structures

See also
 List of tallest structures in Tokyo
 List of tallest structures in Osaka Prefecture
 List of tallest buildings in Nagoya

References
 General
 Diagram of Japanese skyscrapers at SkyscraperPage.com
 Specific

External links
 Diagram of skyscrapers at SkyscraperPage.com

Tallest buildings
Japan